Helen is a 2017 Iranian drama film directed and produced by Ali Akbar Saghafi.

Plot 
Helen is the story of a girl who wants to go Italy but takes a different path due to family problems...

Cast 
 Roshanak Gerami as Helen
 Roya Nonahali as Nasrin (Mother of Helen)
 Pejman Bazeghi as Bobby
 Amin Hayai as Step-Father of Helen
 Hootan Shakiba as Ashkan
 Setareh Pesyani as Negin
 Sahar Khazaeli as Shabnam
 Mehrdad Fallahatgar
 Sara Kashefi
 Ashkan Mehri
 Faranak Kooshafar

References

External links

Helen on Namava

2017 films
2010s Persian-language films
2017 drama films
Iranian drama films